The Mahatma and the Hare: A Dream Story is a novel by H. Rider Haggard.

References

External links
 The Mahatma and the Hare on Internet Archive.
Complete text at Project Gutenberg
 

Novels by H. Rider Haggard
1911 British novels